Ya with breve is equal to Я̆ я̆; (italics: Я̆ я̆) in the Cyrillic script.

Ya with breve is used in the Khanty language.

See also
Cyrillic characters in Unicode

Cyrillic letters with diacritics
Letters with breve